Pedram Salimpour is an Iranian-American physician-scientist, author, professor, entrepreneur and business executive. He is the co-founder of CareNex Health Services (now part of Anthem, Champion Health Enterprises, and Plymouth Health, the latter of which previously owned Alvarado Hospital in San Diego. He has served on numerous boards and is the youngest president in the history of the Los Angeles County Medical Association, a title he has held since 2014. Salimpour is also the first two-time recipient of the American College of Physicians' Research Award. As a keynote speaker he delivered the commencement address to the University of California, Riverside's 2008 graduating class, and gave the keynote address at the 2012 annual colloquium for the Whitehead Institute at MIT in 2012.

Early life and education

Salimpour was born and raised in Tehran, Iran during the Iranian Revolution in the late 1970s. At the age of 10, he was forced to stop playing the piano due to the ban on Western music implemented by radical clerics who were put in place during the revolution. He immigrated along with his family to the United States, six months after his older brother Pejman Salimpour had immigrated to the U.S. Salimpour moved to Los Angeles at age 12 where his father eventually opened his own medical practice after working for Cedars-Sinai Medical Center. He mastered the English language from watching cartoons in English. During his early childhood in Iran, he had previously watched the same cartoons that were dubbed into Persian. He stated that he was able to make the association between the languages after watching the same cartoons again in English. He spoke fluent English without an accent by the time he began junior high school in Woodland Hills in 1981.

Salimpour attended the University of California, Riverside upon graduating from high school. He earned a Bachelor of Science degree in Biology from the school in 1990. He went on to attend UCLA where he earned his Master's Degree in Public Health, Health Services Administration in 1992. Salimpour attended Boston University School of Medicine where he earned a medical degree in 2000. During his time at Boston University, he authored a widely publicized research project that studied the tie between erectile dysfunction to frequent bicycle riding. His study was attributed as the first scientific proof that there is a significantly higher chance of being impotent if you are a cyclist. He was also a principle in the research that led to the introduction of Viagra, later creating the first department of sexual medicine in the United States. He completed his residency at the Keck School of Medicine at the University of Southern California Medical Center. He returned to the University of California, Riverside as a keynote speaker, giving the commencement address to the school's 2008 graduating class.

Career

Salimpour's early career as a physician is linked to the Salimpour Pediatric Medical Group, a pediatric center operated by his father Ralph Salimpour in the greater Los Angeles area. As an entrepreneur, he is the co-founder of three medical companies, one of which previously owned one of San Diego's largest hospitals. He is the co-founder of CareNex Health Services, a health-care technology company that specializes in neonatal and perinatal disease management. The company was founded in 2005 along with his brother Pejman and was acquired by WellPoint (now Anthem) in 2013. The brothers also founded the physician-owned company Plymouth Health, formed for the purpose of acquiring Alvarado Hospital in San Diego. The previous owner of the hospital, Tenet Healthcare Corporation, was accused of paying kickbacks to physicians for referrals to the hospital. As part of a settlement from a civil complaint filed against them, Tenet agreed to sell the hospital and pay a settlement of $21 million. Salimpour and his brother paid approximately $36.5 million for the hospital and invested millions of dollars to upgrade the hospital's equipment and bring in some of the nation's top physicians prior to selling the hospital to Prime Healthcare in 2010.

After the sale of Alvarado, Salimpour co-founded Champion Health Enterprises, a company that specializes in health ecosystems for Native American tribes and business entities with greater than $500 million in annual revenue. He serves as the company's CEO and has partnered with the Morongo Band of Mission Indians since the inception of Champion Health. Salimpour's career in medicine has led him to the role of a writer, filmmaker, and professor. He has written more than 40 medical journal articles. In addition to his contributions in various medical journals, he wrote Photographic Atlas of Pediatric Disorders and Diagnosis, a book that he co-authored with his brother Pejman and his father Ralph Salimpour. He also received a Los Angeles area Emmy Award for his 2006 news documentary The Face of America. At the Center on Human Aging at San Diego State University he works as an adjunct professor and as an associate professor of pediatrics at the University of California Riverside School of Medicine.

Salimpour has served numerous appointments throughout his career. He is credited as the youngest president in the history of the Los Angeles County Medical Association, receiving the appointment in 2014. Additional appointments have included being a member of the board of directors at Boston University School of Medicine and the University of California Los Angeles School of Public Health. He is a founding board member of the School of Medicine at the University of California Riverside. Salimpour was also appointed by then Los Angeles Mayor Antonio Villaraigosa and reappointed by Mayor Eric Garcetti to join the city's Fire and Police Pension Board, a term that he is scheduled to serve through June 2018. As a member of the Board of the Whitehead Institute at MIT, he gave the keynote address at the 2012 annual colloquium.

Awards and recognition

Salimpour has received numerous recognition for his work in the field of medicine, including his collaboration on the work on Viagra gaining international attention in the 1990s. He is highly cited for his work linking both bicycle riding and impotence and for linking smoking with impotence and has been interviewed by media outlets that include the New York Times, the BBC, and CNN. During his time at Boston University School of Medicine, he received a Merck Pharmaceuticals Research Award and became the first medical student to become a two-time recipient of the American College of Physicians' Research Award. He is one of few people to have received both an Alpha Omega Alpha Research Award and an Alpha Omega Alpha Medical Honor Society Membership. He was also recognized in 2003 with a commendation from then California Governor Gray Davis.

Personal life

Salimpour is the co-founder of NexCare Collaborative, a 501c3 organization that helps find affordable health insurance for poor families in the Los Angeles area. It also provides free referral services for foster children to have access to medical services. Salimpour served as the organization's executive vice president from 2001 to 2005. Salimpour is the founding chairman of the board of Directors of the Discovery Science Museum in Los Angeles.

References

External links
Pedram Salimpour on LinkedIn

Living people
American people of Iranian descent
Physicians from California
University of California, Riverside alumni
Boston University School of Medicine alumni
Year of birth missing (living people)